Clara Zetkin (née Eißner ; 5 July 1857 – 20 June 1933) was a German Marxist theorist, communist activist, and advocate for women's rights.

Until 1917, she was active in the Social Democratic Party of Germany. She then joined the Independent Social Democratic Party of Germany (USPD) and its far-left wing, the Spartacist League, which later became the Communist Party of Germany (KPD). She represented that party in the Reichstag during the Weimar Republic from 1920 to 1933.

Biography

Background and education 
Her father, Gottfried Eissner, was a schoolmaster, church organist and a devout Protestant, and her mother, Josephine Vitale, had French roots, came from a middle-class family from Leipzig and was highly educated. In 1872, her family moved to Leipzig, where she was educated at the Leipzig Teachers’ College for Women. There, she established contacts with the infant Sozialdemokratische Partei Deutschlands (SPD; Social Democratic Party).

Because of the ban placed on socialist activity in Germany by Otto von Bismarck in 1878, Zetkin left for Zurich in 1882 and then went into exile in Paris, where she studied to be a journalist and a translator. During her time in Paris, she played an important role in the foundation of the Socialist International group. She also adopted the name of her lover, the Russian-Jewish , a devoted Marxist, with whom she had two sons, Maxim and Konstantin (known as Kostja). Ossip Zetkin became severely ill in early 1889 and died in June of that year. After the loss of her lover, Zetkin moved to Stuttgart with her children. She was married to artist Georg Friedrich Zundel, who was eighteen years her junior, from 1899 to 1928.

Early engagement in Social Democratic Party 

Her political career began after being introduced to Ossip Zetkin, whom she later married. Within a few months of attending and taking part in socialist meetings, Zetkin became entirely committed to the party, which offered a Marxist approach to the demand for women's liberation. Around the time of 1880, due to the political climate in Germany, Zetkin went into exile in Switzerland and later in France. Upon her return to Germany, nearly a decade later, she became the editor of the Social Democratic Party of Germany's newspaper for women, Die Gleichheit (Equality), a post that she occupied for 25 years.

Having studied to become a teacher, Zetkin developed connections with the women's movement and the labour movement in Germany from 1874. In 1878 she joined the Socialist Workers' Party (Sozialistische Arbeiterpartei, SAP). This party had been founded in 1875 by merging two previous parties: the ADAV formed by Ferdinand Lassalle and the SDAP of August Bebel and Wilhelm Liebknecht. In 1890, its name was changed to its modern version Social Democratic Party of Germany (SPD).

Around 1898, Zetkin formed a friendship with the younger Rosa Luxemburg that lasted 20 years. Despite Luxemburg's indifference to the women's movement, which absorbed so much of Zetkin's energies, they became firm political allies on the far left of the SDP. Luxemburg once suggested that their joint epitaph would be "Here lie the last two men of German Social Democracy". In the debate on Revisionism at the turn of the 20th century, they jointly attacked the reformist theses of Eduard Bernstein, who had rejected the ideology of a revolutionary change in favour of "evolutionary socialism".

Fight for women's rights 
Zetkin was very interested in women's politics, including the fight for equal opportunities and women's suffrage, through socialism. She helped to develop the social-democratic women's movement in Germany. From 1891 to 1917, she edited the SPD women's newspaper Die Gleichheit (Equality). In 1907 she became the leader of the newly founded "Women's Office" at the SPD. She also contributed to International Women's Day (IWD). In August 1910, an International Women's Conference was organized to precede the general meeting of the Socialist Second International in Copenhagen, Denmark. Inspired in part by American socialists' actions, Zetkin, Käte Duncker and others proposed that "a special Women's Day" be organized annually, but no date was specified at that conference. Delegates (100 women from 17 countries) agreed with the idea as a strategy to promote equal rights including suffrage for women. The following year on 19 March 1911, IWD was marked for the first time, by over a million people in Austria, Denmark, Germany, and Switzerland.

However, Zetkin was deeply opposed to the concept of "bourgeois feminism," which she claimed was a tool to divide the unity of the working classes. In a speech that she delivered to the Second International in 1889, she stated:
The working women, who aspire to social equality, expect nothing for their emancipation from the bourgeois women’s movement, which allegedly fights for the rights of women. That edifice is built on sand and has no real basis. Working women are absolutely convinced that the question of the emancipation of women is not an isolated question which exists in itself, but part of the great social question. They realize perfectly clear that this question can never be solved in contemporary society, but only after a complete social transformation.

She viewed the feminist movement as being primarily composed of upper-class and middle-class women who had their own class interests in mind, which were incompatible with the interests of working-class women. Thus, feminism and the socialist fight for women's rights were incompatible. In her mind, socialism was the only way to truly end the oppression of women. One of her primary goals was to get women out of the house and into work so that they could participate in trade unions and other workers rights organizations to improve conditions for themselves. While she argued that the socialist movement should fight to achieve reforms that would lessen female oppression, she was convinced that such reforms could only prevail if they were embedded into a general move towards socialism; otherwise, they could easily be eradicated by future legislation.

She interviewed Vladimir Lenin on "The Women's Question" in 1920.

Opposition to First World War 
During the period of the First World War, at the international women's peace conference in Switzerland, activists, revolutionaries, and supporters gathered to confront the concern for unity among workers across the battle lines. There, Zetkin spoke:
 Who profits from this war? Only a tiny minority in each nation: The manufacturers of rifles and cannons, of armor-plate and torpedo boats, the shipyard owners and the suppliers of the armed forces' needs. In the interests of their profits, they have fanned the hatred among the people, thus contributing to the outbreak of the war. The workers have nothing to gain from this war, but they stand to lose everything that is dear to them.

Zetkin, along with Karl Liebknecht, Rosa Luxemburg, Luise Kähler and other influential SPD politicians, rejected the party's policy of Burgfrieden (a truce with the government and promising to refrain from strikes during the war). Among other anti-war activities, Zetkin organized an international socialist women's anti-war conference in Berlin in 1915. Because of her anti-war opinions, she was arrested several times during the war and was in 1916 taken into "protective custody" from which she was later released on account of illness.

Joining Communist Party 
In 1916 Zetkin was one of the co-founders of the Spartacist League and the Independent Social Democratic Party of Germany (USPD) which had split off in 1917 from its mother party, the SPD, in protest at its pro-war stance.

In January 1919, after the German Revolution in November of the previous year, the KPD (Communist Party of Germany) was founded. Zetkin also joined it and represented the party from 1920 to 1933 in the Reichstag. She and Paul Levi were the first communists to enter the Reichstag.

Until 1924, Zetkin was a member of the KPD's central office. From 1927 to 1929, she was a member of the party's central committee. She was also a member of the executive committee of the Communist International (Comintern) from 1921 to 1933. She also presided over an international secretariat for women, which was created by the Communist International in October 1920. In June 1921, the Second International Conference of Communist Women, which was held in Moscow and was chaired by her, changed the date of the International Women's Day to 8 March. That has remained the date of the IWD. In 1925, she was elected president of the German left-wing solidarity organisation Rote Hilfe.

In summer 1922, Zetkin was part of the prosecution team during the Trial of the Socialist Revolutionaries in Moscow, but at other times, she was critical of Moscow's influence over the German Communist Party within which she was part of the right wing. She was removed from the Central Committee of the KPD when the left, led by Ruth Fischer took control. She opposed a policy decision made in Moscow in 1928 to get communist trade unions in Germany to split from the main socialist-dominated federation and form the rival Rote Gewerkschaftsbund. When Joseph Stalin put this to the executive of Comintern, in December 1928, Zetkin was one of only three members of the executive to vote against. The other two, Angelo Tasca and Jules Humbert-Droz, were publicly humiliated the following year, but Zetkin retained her position as a member of the executive, and the Praesidium of Comintern.

In August 1932, despite having recently fallen gravely ill in Moscow, she returned to Berlin to preside over the opening of the newly elected Reichstag, as its oldest deputy. She used her opening address to call for workers to unite in the struggle against fascism:
 The most important immediate task is the formation of a United Front of all workers in order to turn back fascism [..] in order to preserve for the enslaved and exploited, the force and power of their organization as well as to maintain their own physical existence. Before this compelling historical necessity, all inhibiting and dividing political, trade union, religious and ideological opinions must take a back seat. All those who feel themselves threatened, all those who suffer and all those who long for liberation must belong to the United Front against fascism and its representatives in government.

She was a recipient of the Order of Lenin (1932) and the Order of the Red Banner (1927).

Exile and death

Soon after Adolf Hitler and his Nazi Party took power in 1933, the Reichstag fire gave the Nazi government opportunity to outright ban the KPD and other dissenting political parties. Zetkin went into exile for the last time, this time to the Soviet Union. She died there, at Arkhangelskoye, near Moscow, in 1933, aged nearly 76. Her ashes were placed in the Kremlin Wall Necropolis, by the Moscow Kremlin Wall, near the Red Square. The funeral was attended by leading communists from all over Europe, including Joseph Stalin and Nadezhda Krupskaya (Lenin's widow).

After 1949, Zetkin became a much-celebrated heroine in the German Democratic Republic (East Germany), and every major city had a street named after her. Her name can still be found on the maps of the former lands of the GDR. There is also a street in Tula, Russia named for Zetkin (ул. Клары Цеткин) which runs parallel to Red Army Prospect which is the main thoroughfare leading to the Moscow Train Station in that city.

Works

Posthumous honors 
 Zetkin was memorialized on the ten mark banknote and twenty mark coin of the German Democratic Republic (GDR) (East Germany).
 After 1949, every major city in the GDR had a street named after her.
 In 1954, the GDR established the Clara Zetkin Medal (Clara-Zetkin-Medaille).
 In 1955, the city council of Leipzig established a new recreation area near the city center called "Clara-Zetkin-Park"
 In 1967, a statue of Clara Zetkin, sculpted by GDR artist Walter Arnold, was erected in Johannapark, Leipzig in commemoration of her 110th birthday.
 In 1987, the GDR issued a stamp with her picture.
 Since 2011, the German party Die Linke issues an annual "".

See also

 List of peace activists
 Alexandra Kollontai
 Nadezhda Krupskaya
 Rosa Luxemburg

References

Sources

Further reading 
 Full works of Clara Zetkin available (in English) at the Marxist Internet archive
 Full works of Clara Zetkin available (in German) at the Marxist Internet archive
 Timeline of Clara Zetkin's life (in German), at the Lebendiges Museum Online (LEMO)
 Clara Zetkin, Clara Zetkin: Selected Writing, 1991, .
 Dorothea Reetz, Clara Zetkin as a Socialist Speaker, Intl. Pub, 1987, .
 Gilbert Badia, Clara Zetkin: Féministe Sans Frontières (Paris: Les Éditions Ouvrières 1993).
 
 Luise Dornemann, Clara Zetkin: Leben und Wirken, Dietz; 9., überarbeit. Aufl edition (1989), 
 Karen Honeycutt, "Clara Zetkin: A left-wing socialist and feminist in Wilhelmian Germany," Ph.D. thesis, Columbia University, 1975
 Clara Zetkin biography at FemBio.org (in German)
 Clara Zetkin biography from the University of Leipzig (in German)

External links 
 
 
 
 Clara Zetkin at Spartacus Educational (biography, extracts)
 Zetkin at marxists.org (biography, some writings, links)
 
 My Recollections of Lenin by Clara Zetkin

1857 births
1933 deaths
People from Mittelsachsen
People from the Kingdom of Saxony
Social Democratic Party of Germany politicians
Independent Social Democratic Party politicians
Communist Party of Germany politicians
Members of the Reichstag of the Weimar Republic
20th-century German women politicians
Executive Committee of the Communist International
German anti-war activists
German Comintern people
German suffragists
German people of French descent
Luxemburgists
Marxist feminists
Marxist theorists
Burials at the Kremlin Wall Necropolis
Refugees from Nazi Germany in the Soviet Union
German socialists
German socialist feminists
Recipients of the Order of Lenin
Recipients of the Order of the Red Banner
19th-century German writers
20th-century German writers
19th-century German women writers
20th-century German women writers
Women Marxists
Female revolutionaries